Wien Penzing is a railway station in Vienna, Austria. It is a stop on two S-Bahn lines, the S45 and S50. The station has three platforms and four tracks. Tracks 1 and 2 are for the S50, while tracks 3 and 4 are for the S45. 

Wien Penzing was opened in 1858 for the Empress Elisabeth Railway.

References

Penzing
Railway stations opened in 1858